Seryozha is a Russian diminutive form of the name Sergei, which may refer to:

 Seryozha (novel), 1955 novel by Soviet writer Vera Panova
 Seryozha (English: Splendid Days), 1960 Soviet drama film adaptation of the novel
 5094 Seryozha, minor planet